Guido Martín Falaschi (1 October 1989 – 13 November 2011) was an Argentine racecar driver.

He raced between 2005 and 2011. In 2008 won the Formula Renault Argentina championship. In Turismo Carretera and TC 2000 series he raced and won races, while in Top Race V6 he won the 2010 Copa América championship.

Guido Falaschi died on November 13, 2011 at the age of 22 in a crash in the Turismo de Carretera race at the Autódromo Juan Manuel Fangio in Balcarce in his native Argentina's Buenos Aires.

References

External links
 

1989 births
2011 deaths
Argentine racing drivers
Racing drivers who died while racing
Filmed deaths in motorsport
Sport deaths in Argentina
Formula Renault Argentina drivers
Turismo Carretera drivers
Top Race V6 drivers
TC 2000 Championship drivers
Sportspeople from Santa Fe Province